The Capture of Capri, also known as the Battle of Capri or Capri Campaign was an attempted invasion by émigré and foreign units of the British Army to establish a foothold in the area of Capri in the Bay of Naples.

Background 
In 1808, following the success of Napoleon I in his Prussian Campaign, the British discussed with their Russian and Sicilian allies the opening of a new "southern front" preferably in the area of Sicily or the Balkans. In 1807, the British officially established the Mediterranean Fleet. However, it was usually under-strength and consisted of just two squadrons, one based out of Gibraltar and the other in Malta. That year, Vice-Admiral Sir Thomas Francis Fremantle took command of this new fleet and formed two new frigate squadrons at the aforementioned locations to conduct raids on French trade routes and locations.

It was eventually decided to open a new front in Capri under the supervision of the British, yet actually carried out by foreign British forces. Colonel Hudson Lowe (later promoted to Brigadier General) commanded the British, and Général de Division Jean Maximilien Lamarque (reporting to Murat) commanding the French.

The British position was initially seen as strong as the small squadron stationed off the coast comprised the 44-gun fifth-rate ship of the line, HMS Ambuscade. However, just as gunfire began, the ship sped off to get help; she returned on the 8th October with a 28-gun sixth-rate Enterprise-class frigate, HMS Mercury. This force was once again held back when adverse weather hampered their operations.

Battle 
On 5 October 1808 the British force landed with the assistance of HMS Ambuscade and established a base on the island. By 15-16 October, the Franco-Neapolitan force landed on Capri and the battle began, with the French losing almost no men, and the British force being mostly captured or wounded.

Because the British didn't work together with their Neapolitan guerrilla and Sicilian allies, the invasion was finished before it really started. In addition, the King of Naples, Maréchal d'Empire Joachim-Napoléon Murat organised his forces and troops of the French Army of Naples well to take out the invaders. In the end, the campaign was considered a resounding success for the French and their Neapolitan allies, and a horrible failure for the British.

As the British landed, King Murat sent out a force under the command of Lamarque to attack the British and chase them from the lands. Lamarque attacked, and was able to force the British to capitulate within a matter of hours.

Aftermath 
Following the surrender of the garrison, the Royal Regiment of Malta suffered the worst, but the 300 man remnant escaped and planned a raid on Naples. However, this abortive attempt at glory caused the regiment to lose its colours.

The remainder of the force, including 680 Maltese captured including 22 officers, were evacuated to Sicily under the terms of surrender. This small yet decisive action gave a tremendous boost to French prestige in the area.

Order of Battle

Franco-Neapolitan Forces 
Note: the term elite companies refers to the Grenadier and Voltigeur companies of battalions (flank companies).  The names in italics refers to the nation of which these units came from, they were not used in their respective titles however.

 Franco-Neapolitan Forces, commanded de jure Maréchal d’Empire King of Naples, Joachim, 1st Prince Murat, de facto General de Division Jean Maximilien Lamarque
 Generals de Brigade Pignatelli, Strongoli, and Cataneo were present, unknown what capacity
 1st Neapolitan Line Infantry Regiment (3 x battalions)
 2nd Neapolitan Line Infantry Regiment (3 x battalions)
 3rd Italian Line Infantry Regiment (2 x battalions)
 1 x Battalion, French Corsican Legion
 Elite Companies, 23rd French Line Infantry Regiment
 Elite Companies, 52nd French Line Infantry Regiment
 Elite Companies, 62nd French Line Infantry Regiment
 1 x Company, Isenburg Infantry Regiment
 Marines of the Neapolitan Royal Guard
 1 x Company, Neapolitan Sappers Battalion
 Franco-Neapolitan Naval Force, commanded by Capitaine de Frégate
 Neapolitan 40-gun Frigate, Cerere
 French Pallas-class 40-gun corvette Renommée
 26 x gunboats (with 24-pounder siege guns)
 1 x Mortar Gunboat
 180 x transport craft of all types
 16 x other boats (earmarked for the marinas)

British Garrison 
The British Garrison on Capri numbered around 1,500 men by the time of the invasion.  Under the terms of surrender, the garrison was to be evacuated to Sicily with colours and all honours of war.

 British Garrison on Capri, commanded by Brigadier General Hudson Lowe
 Royal Regiment of Malta (9 x companies, 44 NCOs and 620 men)
 Royal Corsican Rangers (10 x companies, 44 NCOs and 640 men)
200 x Sicilian Irregulars
21 x guns (7, 32, 36, and 37-pounders, remainder carronades, older cannons, and 4-pounder light guns)
Royal Navy Forces in the area (see background above)
44-gun Amazon-class fifth-rate frigate, HMS Ambuscade
28-gun Enterprise-class sixth-rate frigate, HMS Mercury – arriving on the 8th

Footnotes 
Notes

Citations

References 

 Charles Mullié, Biographie des célébrités militaires des armées de terre et de mer de 1789 à 1850 Tome Seconde, 1857, Paris, France.

Battles in 1808
Battles involving France
Battles involving the United Kingdom
Battles involving the Kingdom of Naples
Battles involving the Kingdom of Italy (Napoleonic)
Battles inscribed on the Arc de Triomphe
Battles in Campania